Thaila Lucia Zucchi (born 19 January 1981) is a British singer and actress of English and Italian descent. She began her career as a member of the British band allSTARS* before transitioning into acting, appearing in Big Brother 8 in the UK, where she played the part of fake Australian housemate Pauline. She has also appeared in Balls of Steel and Star Stories, as well as the TV series Blandings.

Music career
Zucchi was a member of allSTARS*, a band that started out on the children's television show STARStreet (shown on CITV). She performed in more than twenty arenas around the UK, and on Top of the Pops, CD:UK, and SMTV numerous times. The band was contracted to Island Records and enjoyed four top 20 hits and released an album, with tracks that were featured in the movies Thunderpants and Scooby Doo. Zucchi remains close friends with the other band members.

Television career
Zucchi appeared in Channel 4's Balls of Steel. Her role on the show is known as the Bunny Boiler. She would find a man in a public place with his partner, and outrageously flirt with him to antagonise his partner. Her other television credits include The IT Crowd, Massive Balls of Steel, Popworld, Hyperdrive,  and as a presenter for Nickelodeon and The Record of the Year. In 2006 and 2007, she had several roles in the Channel 4 comedy series Star Stories, including Courteney Cox, Sharon Osbourne, and also Geri Halliwell in Simon Cowell – My Honesty, My Genius.

In 2007, Zucchi entered the Big Brother UK house, pretending to be Pauline, a housemate from Australian Big Brother. She was working secretly for Big Brother as a mole, going to and from the house to appear on Big Brother's Little Brother. She presented Big Brother's Big Mouth, another spin-off show from 17–20 July 2007, as part of the lineup replacing ex-'Big Mouth' presenter, Russell Brand. Zucchi also appeared in a DOE advertisement about the dangers of drunk driving, and in adverts for Hula Hoops, Setanta Sports and Brunchettas.

In 2007, Zucchi appeared in an episode of sitcom Not Going Out as lap-dancer Rosie. She appears in season 2 of Strutter on MTV. She has presented a show on Virgin 1 called "Boob Envy" about how women see their breasts, during which she revealed she has 'permanently erect nipples', and is also part of the presenting team of Sky One's Brainiac and the cast of the second series of Touch Me, I'm Karen Taylor for BBC Three. In 2009, she played a small role in one episode of Skins and an episode of Law and Order: UK broadcast on ITV on 23 September 2010. She is also in Richard Hammond's Blast Lab and presents the "How Hard is Your Thing?" segment in Brainiac: Science Abuse.

Zucchi acted in Coming of Age in one episode as a French teacher which was first shown on 26 January 2010, has appeared in the series Frankie Boyle's Tramadol Nights, which started airing on 30 November 2010 and has starred in adverts for Sky Broadband. Most recently, she acted in several sketches in Charlie Brooker's How TV Ruined Your Life. She appears in BBC reality TV series World Series of Dating as fictional host Poppy Weathers, which started airing on 26 March 2012. In January 2013 she played Paquita Manganara in BBC One's comedy series Blandings.

She appeared as Police Sergeant Randall in the Channel 4 show Shameless.

Filmography

Film
 The Hippopotamus

Television

References

External links
 
 Thaila Zucchi at RDF Management
 World Series of Dating

1981 births
Living people
Actresses from Wiltshire
Allstars (band) members
English people of Italian descent
English television actresses
Italian British musicians
Musicians from Wiltshire
People from Swindon
21st-century English actresses
21st-century English women singers
21st-century English singers